The Central Department was an administrative subdivision of the Mexican Federal District. It was formed in 1928 from the former municipalities of Mexico, Tacuba, Tacubaya and Mixcoac. In 1941, the delegación of General Anaya was merged with the Central Department to form Mexico City.

Mexico City